Dietrich Enns (born May 16, 1991) is an American professional baseball pitcher for the Saitama Seibu Lions of Nippon Professional Baseball (NPB). He has played in Major League Baseball (MLB) for the Minnesota Twins and Tampa Bay Rays.

Amateur career
Enns attended Lincoln-Way East High School in Frankfort, Illinois, and Central Michigan University. He played college baseball for the Central Michigan Chippewas. In 2011, he played collegiate summer baseball with the Hyannis Harbor Hawks of the Cape Cod Baseball League, and was named a league all-star.

Professional career

New York Yankees
The New York Yankees selected Enns in the 19th round of the 2012 Major League Baseball draft. He made his professional debut for the Staten Island Yankees. In 22 games, he had a 2–0 win–loss record with a 2.11 earned run average (ERA) and 33 strikeouts over  innings. He started the 2013 season with the Charleston RiverDogs. He was promoted to the Class A-Advanced Tampa Yankees during the season. Overall, he pitched in 28 games with eight starts, and went 4–6 with a 2.94 ERA and 112 strikeouts in  innings.

In 2014, he stayed with Tampa where he posted a 1.42 ERA in 13 games and  innings, but his season was ended by an injury which required Tommy John surgery.  He returned in June 2015, to pitch with the Gulf Coast League Yankees and the Tampa Yankees, where he put up a 0.61 ERA and 55 strikeouts in  innings between the two clubs.  Whereas Enns had primarily appeared out of the bullpen prior to his surgery, he made 12 starts in his 13 games in 2015.

2016 saw Enns make both his Double-A and Triple-A debuts, moving back and forth between the Trenton Thunder and Scranton/Wilkes-Barre RailRiders. He put up a 1.73 ERA in 22 starts between the two levels, striking out 124 in 135 innings.  He earned Eastern League Player of the Month honors in April.

Minnesota Twins
He began 2017 with Triple-A Wilkes-Barre, and on July 30 the Yankees traded Enns and Zack Littell to the Minnesota Twins in exchange for Jaime García and cash consideration.  He pitched in three games with the Rochester Red Wings before his promotion to the big leagues.  At the time of his promotion, he had slightly more than one strikeout per inning and had allowed only 13 home runs over his minor league career.

The Twins promoted Enns to make his major league debut on August 10, where he started against the Milwaukee Brewers. After a relief appearance, Enns was scheduled to start again on August 20, but instead was placed on the disabled list with a strained shoulder, having allowed a total of 3 earned runs in 4 innings.  Enns made two rehab starts with Rochester, and then was activated and optioned to the Double-A Chattanooga Lookouts in September.

Enns began the 2018 season with the RedWings, again working as a starter.  After putting up a 4.50 ERA in 20 innings over 4 starts, Enns was designated for assignment on May 1.  Enns cleared waivers and was later assigned to Chattanooga in late June.  He finished the season with a 4.60 ERA in 22 starts for both clubs, posting 106 strikeouts in 129 innings. Enns became a free agent when the 2018 season concluded.

San Diego Padres
On November 29, 2018, Enns signed a minor league contract with the San Diego Padres. In 2019 he was 11-11 and led the minor leagues in home runs given up (37). He became a free agent following the 2019 season.

Seattle Mariners
On February 17, 2020, Enns signed a minor league deal with the Seattle Mariners. On May 27, 2020, Enns was released by the Mariners organization.

After his release, Enns pitched 18 innings for the independent Tully Monsters, allowing only 2 runs and 10 hits.

Tampa Bay Rays
On August 18, 2020, Enns signed a minor league deal with the Tampa Bay Rays.

On August 3, 2021, the Rays selected Enns' contract.
In his Rays debut, Enns tossed 1 scoreless inning against the Baltimore Orioles. Enns was released by the Rays on November 17, 2021 after recording a 2.82 ERA in 22 1/3 innings.

Saitama Seibu Lions
On November 23, 2021, Enns signed with the Saitama Seibu Lions of Nippon Professional Baseball.

Personal life
Enns and his wife, Julie Anne, married in 2019.

References

External links

1991 births
Living people
People from Frankfort, Illinois
Baseball players from Illinois
Major League Baseball pitchers
Minnesota Twins players
Tampa Bay Rays players
Central Michigan Chippewas baseball players
Hyannis Harbor Hawks players
Staten Island Yankees players
Charleston RiverDogs players
Tampa Yankees players
Gulf Coast Yankees players
Trenton Thunder players
Scranton/Wilkes-Barre RailRiders players
Chattanooga Lookouts players
Rochester Red Wings players
Bravos de Margarita players
American expatriate baseball players in Venezuela
El Paso Chihuahuas players
Durham Bulls players
Nippon Professional Baseball pitchers
Saitama Seibu Lions players
Eau Claire Express players